For the video game, see Ratchet & Clank Future: Tools of Destruction.

Tools Of Destruction is Finnish power metal band Thunderstone's third album.

Track listing
"Tool of the Devil" (Laurenne) – 4:02       
"Without Wings" (Laurenne, Tornack) – 4:43       
"Liquid of the Kings" (Laurenne, Tornack) – 5:59       
"I Will Come Again" (Laurenne) – 4:28       
"Welcome to the Real" (Hjelm) – 6:34       
"Last Song" (Laurenne, Tornack) – 4:19       
"Another Time" (Laurenne) – 3:39       
"Feed the Fire" (Hjelm) – 4:42       
"Weight of the World" (Laurenne, Tornack) – 5:52       
"Land of Innocence" (Laurenne, Tornack, Rantanen, Rantanen) – 8:08
"Rainbow in the Dark" (Dio cover) (Japanese bonus track) - 4:47
"Spire (Acoustic radio live version) - 4:40
"Spread My Wings (First demo version) - 5:33

Chart Finnish

Personnel
Pasi Rantanen - lead vocals
Nino Laurenne- guitar, backing vocal
Titus Hjelm - bass, backing vocal
Mirka "Leka" Rantanen - drums
Kari Tornack - keyboards

2004 albums